The fifteenth series of the British semi-reality television programme The Only Way Is Essex was confirmed on 26 November 2014 when it had been announced that it had renewed for at least a further two series, the fourteenth and fifteenth. The series launched on 14 June 2015 with two Marbella specials. After the launch of the new series, it will be immediately followed by another one-off special "TOWIE: All Back to Essex" hosted by Mark Wright. It is the third series to feature on ITV's new channel ITVBe. As well as confirming the new launch date, it was confirmed that ITV had renewed their contract keeping the show for a further six series, taking it to Series 21. Ahead of the series it was announced that cast member Ricky Rayment had taken a short break from the show but would be back, however he did not return. It was also confirmed that Mario Falcone had been suspended from the show for the second time, this time after promoting slimming pills on social media. He returned during the fourth episode. This was the final series to feature long-running cast member Gemma Collins until her brief return for the Essexmas special, and first to include new cast member Pete Wicks.

Cast

Episodes

{| class="wikitable plainrowheaders" style="width:100%; background:#fff;"
! style="background:#31B404;"| Seriesno.
! style="background:#31B404;"| Episodeno.
! style="background:#31B404;"| Title
! style="background:#31B404;"| Original air date
! style="background:#31B404;"| Duration
! style="background:#31B404;"| UK viewers

|}

Reception

Ratings

References

The Only Way Is Essex
2015 British television seasons